Alistair Duncan, also credited as Alastair Duncan,  was an English actor.

Biography
Duncan was accepted at the age of 16 into the Royal Academy of Dramatic Art, he had a long career in performance. Particularly with his association with Australia, including playing Puck in Shakespeare's A Midsummer Night's Dream to largely but not exclusively school student audiences at the Theatre Royal in Adelaide in 1951/2. He starred in the Australian Broadcasting Commission radio series "Dr Paul" as a voice actor, and performed in New York Broadway in the play Under Milk Wood. Later in his career he appeared in the television soap opera Home and Away and became the director of the Marian Street Theatre.

Duncan also appeared in numerous theatre roles starting in 1952

Filmography

References

External links

English stage actors
Australian stage actors
Australian film actors
Australian television actors
English film actors
English television actors
20th-century English actors
1926 births
2005 deaths